Galepus is an extinct genus of anomodont therapsids.

See also 
 List of therapsids

References 

Anomodont genera
Permian synapsids
Prehistoric synapsids of Africa
Fossil taxa described in 1910
Taxa named by Robert Broom